The office of High Sheriff of Clwyd was established in 1974 as part of the creation of the county of Clwyd in Wales following the Local Government Act 1972, and effectively replaced the shrievalties of the amalgamated counties of Flintshire and Denbighshire.

High Sheriffs of Clwyd 
1974 Philip John Warburton-Lee of Broad Oak, Whitchurch, Salop.
1975 John Wynne Bankes of Mynachlog, Northop.
1976 William Reinallt Williams of Llewesog Hall, Prion, near Denbigh.
1977 Sir Wyndham Charles Henry Hanmer, 6th Baronet of The Mere House, Hanmer, Whitchurch 
1978 Patrick Beaumont, of Donadea Lodge, Babell.
1979 Raffaello William Biagi of Coed Coppi Fancer, Llandyrnog.
1980 David Foulk Myddleton of Caeaugwynion Farm, Chirk.
1981 Miss Marigold Evelyn Graham of Plas-yn-Rhos, Ruthin.
1982 Arthur David Bentley Brooks of Higher Barns, Malpas, Cheshire 
1983 Major Thomas Smith of Gwaenynog, Denbigh.
1984 David Humphrey Griffith of Garthmeilio, Llangwm.
1985 Mrs Noreen Louisa Edwards of Pine Trees, Llanrwst Road, Upper Colwyn Bay
1986 The Hon. Lloyd Tyrell-Kenyon, of Gredington, Whitchurch, Shropshire.
1987 Geoffrey Laird Jackson of Plas Newydd, Llanfair Dyffryn Clwyd, Ruthin.
1988 Hugh Simon Fetherstonhaugh of Faenol Bach, Bodelwyddan, Rhyl.
1989 David Mars-Jones of LLansannan, Denbigh.
1990 Sir Watkin Williams-Wynn, 11th Baronet of Plas-yn-Cefn, St. Asaph.
1991 Philip Peter Davies-Cooke of Gwysaney Hall, Mold.
1992 Robert Gwynn Hughes of Brook House Farm, Denbigh.
1993 Philip Caulfield Godsal
1994 Captain Nicholas Montgomery Archdale of Penbedw, Nannerch, Mold.
1995 William Field Glazebrook 
1996 Roger Henry William Graham-Palmer of Cefn Park, Wrexham.
1997 Sir Charles Douglas Lowther, 6th Baronet
1998 Colonel Henry Michael Edward Cadogan of Fron Isaf, Pentre Celyn, Ruthin.
1999 Derwen Eurfyl Williams of Plas Yn Cwm, St Asaph, Denbighshire
2000 Maurice Carstairs Jones-Mortimer 
2001 Robert John Best of Plas Yn Vivod, Llangollen.
2002 Commander Francis John Cadman Bradshaw of Rhagatt Hall, Carrog, Corwen.
2003 Nicholas David Bankes of Cilcain, near Mold.
2004 Dr Julia Helen O'Hara of Padeswood, Near Mold 
2005 Harold Michael Clunie Cunningham 
2006 Susan Gordon Hudson 
2007 Jonathan Patrick Neale Major 
2008 Stephen Dudley Cheshire of Denbigh
2009 Henry Geoffrey Robertson of Corwen
2010 Lady Janet Jones of Hawarden 
2011 E F Lloyd FitzHugh of Wrexham 
2012 Henry M Dixon of Llangynhafal, Denbigh 
2013 Celia Jenkins of Llangollen 
2014 J D Meredith Jones of The Old Rectory, Bodfari, Denbigh 
2015 Mrs Janet Patricia Evans of Llanrwst, Conwy 
2016 James Peter O'Toole of Cwm Dyserth, Rhyl
2017 Mrs Charlotte Henrietta Gaylyn Howard of Llandyrnog, Denbigh
2018 Lady Hanmer of Whitchurch
2019 Mrs Stephanie Lynne Catherall of Nercwys, Near Mold 
2020 David Heneage Wynne-Finch of Bettws-y-Coed 
2021 John Stephen Thomas of St Asaph 
2022 Mrs Zoe Jane Henderson of Ruthin 
2023 Mrs Kate Louise Hill-Trevor

See also
 High Sheriff of Flintshire
 High Sheriff of Denbighshire

References

Clwyd